Fabian Schroedter (born ) is a German male former water polo player. He was part of the Germany men's national water polo team. He was a part of the  team at the 2004 Summer Olympics. He competed at world championships, including at the 2011 World Aquatics Championships.  On club level he played for Wasserfreunde Spandau 04 in Germany.

References

1982 births
Living people
German male water polo players
Water polo players at the 2004 Summer Olympics
Olympic water polo players of Germany
Water polo players from Berlin